Chhagalnaiya is a town in Feni district of Chittagong Division, Bangladesh. The town is the administrative headquarters and urban centre of Chhagalnaiya Upazila.The urban area of Chhagalnaiya is the biggest in Chhagalnaiya Upazila and 2nd most populous in Feni district. Chhagalnaiya is 14.6 km away from the district headquarter, Feni city while the distance from Divisional Headquarter, Chittagong is 96.6 km. The nearest airport from Chhagalnaiya town is Shah Amanat International Airport.

History
Chhagalnaiya is also the name for eponymous upazila in Feni district of Bangladesh. It is believed that the name of the area changed from Sagarnaiya (whom the sea bathes or bathes) to Chagalnaiya, as a result of mistakenly writing L instead of R in official documents during the British rule. Due to its convenient geographical location and proximity to the border, the place has historically played an important role - especially during the liberation war of Bangladesh.
Goats have nothing to do with this region, on the other hand it is a region created by the freezing of the sea char and Naiya means sailor, it means Sagarnaiya is a sea sailor.
Chhagalnaiya is actually a derivative of Sagarnaiya or sea-sailor as many people from this region used to go to the sea to earn their bread.

Climate

Geography
It has an average elevation of 8 metres.

Demography
According to 2011 Bangladesh census, Chhgalnaiya town has a population of about 48,243 of which 23,857 are male and 24,386 are female.

Administration
The towns is administrated by a local governing body called Chhagalnaiya Municipality or Chhagalnaiya Paurashava which has divided the town into 9 wards. The town occupies an area of 27.04 km2 of which municipality governs an area of 25.2
5 km2.

Transport
The town is the road transport hub of the upazila. Z1035 runs north  to Parshuram. Z1032 runs south  to Muhuriganj, where it connects to the Dhaka-Chittagong Highway.

Education
The literacy rate of the town is 62.7%.
Some of the notable educational institution of the town are:
 Chhagalnaiya government college
 Chhagalnaiya academy
 Chhagalnaiya Govt. Pilot high school
 Chhagalnaiya Pilot girls high School
 Moulovi Samsul Karim College
 Radhanagar High School
 Karaiya High School

See also
 Chhagalnaiya Upazila
 Feni District
 Chittagong Division
 List of municipal corporations in Bangladesh

References

Chittagong District
Populated places in Feni District